Internal colonialism is the uneven effects of economic development on a regional basis, otherwise known as "uneven development" as a result of the exploitation of minority groups within a wider society which leads to political and economic inequalities between regions within a state. This is held to be similar to the relationship between a metropole and a colony, in colonialism proper. The phenomenon leads to the distinct separation of the dominant core from the periphery in an empire. 

Robert Blauner is regarded as the developer of the theory of internal colonialism. The term was coined to highlight the "blurred" lines between geographically close locations that are clearly different in terms of culture. Some other factors that separate the core from the periphery are language, religion, physical appearance, types and levels of technology, and sexual behavior. The cultural and integrative nature of internal colonialism is understood as a project of modernity and it has been explored by Robert Peckham in relation to the formation of a national modern Greek culture during the nineteenth century, when Greece gained its independence from the Ottoman Empire.

The main difference between neocolonialism and internal colonialism is the source of the exploitation. In the former, the control comes from outside the nation-state, while in the latter it comes from within.

Origin of the concept
The first known use of the concept of internal colonialism was by  regarding South Africa. Gonzalez Casanova was both critiqued by, and influenced Andre Gunder Frank, who further theorised internal colonialism as a form of "uneven development". Sergio Salvi, a poet, essayist, and historian of minority languages, used the term "internal colonies" in the cultural sense in Le nazioni proibite: Guida a dieci colonie interne dell'Europa occidentale ("The forbidden nations: Guide to ten internal colonies of western Europe") (1973), among which he included Catalonia, Scotland, Brittany and Occitania. Other pivotal works on the subject were published during the mid-1970s by Harold Wolpe and Michael Hechter. Adolf Hitler mentions the concept of Internal colonization in his book Mein Kampf of 1925, chapter 4, as a wrong way of tackling the problems that come with the increase of population of a nation. He states that "The limitation to a definite small area of soil, inherent in internal colonization,... leads to an exceedingly unfavorable politicomilitary situation in the nation in question."

Examples
A common topic amongst postcolonial writers was their description of feelings, such as schizophrenia, being torn between local tradition and global modernity.

Afghanistan
Afghanistan is an example of internal colonialism affecting state-building, as Nazif Shahrani argues "the incessantly centralizing state policies and practices of internal colonialism, generally aided and abetted by old colonialist powers... produced a cumulatively negative impact on state-building efforts in Afghanistan." The international security scholar, Dipali Mukhopadhyay, considers the presence of warlordism in the Afghan periphery to be a concern for the development of the political economy, with the 2007 World Bank Report highlighting weak institutional links between provincial offices and relationships with the central government poorly defined.

Algeria
One of the exceptions of internal colonialism as the subsistence of 'blurred lines' between the core and periphery is French Algeria. There were clearly distinct features separating the core from the periphery. "The core was Christian, French-speaking, light-skinned, and comparatively prosperous". The other side was Muslim, Arabic/ Berber-speaking, and significantly poorer. The grey section of French Algeria, was the large Jewish population which did not belong in either the core or periphery, in terms of common cultural factors.

Baltic states
In the mid-twentieth century, the Soviet-annexed countries of Estonia, Latvia, and Lithuania had a colonial relationship with the rest of the Soviet Union, similar to the one that existed between the old tsarist empire and its far-flung territories. Although the countries were gradually being Sovietized after their period of initial resistance, the newly established economic, cultural, and social circumstances were colonial, as the reconstruction of the economy in the region served the interests of the colonizers, identities became shaped in relation to the increasing Soviet presence, the experience of oppression became an increasingly important part of the local culture, and local historical and cultural heritage was revalued and rewritten. When the Soviet Union dissolved and the Baltic states became independent once again, they had to deal with problems similar to other postcolonial nations: polluted landscapes, damaged economies, ethnic tensions, and determining the national narrative of the past, present and future.

Canada

 documents the internal colonialism of Western Canadian Provinces by Central Canada, citing issues with the National Energy Program, the Crow Rate, and Equalization payments in Canada amongst others.

Ireland
An example of internal colonialism is Ireland. Ireland was formerly a part of the United Kingdom and "...was far more common and apparently easier, to think of oneself as British and Irish". It was increasingly more difficult to choose between the two.

Philippines

In the Philippines, non-Manilans have often expressed that the affairs of the country—whether political, economic but most importantly cultural including linguistic—are imposed from the Manilan core on the peripheral rest of the country due to Tagalist nationalism. This has been articulated in a Cebuano saying, which goes, "Walay dahong mahulog sa atong nasod nga dili mananghid sa Malakanyang," translated as "Not a leaf may fall in our country without Malacañang's permission." It is also ominous that certain personalities have called for the political isolation, overthrow and outright assassination of those who are opposed to the current core–periphery relationship.

Sri Lanka

International Dimensions of the Ethnic Conflict in Sri Lanka, Prof John P. Neelsen (Tuebingen University, Germany), 20th European Conference on Modern South Asian Studies, 8–11 July 2008: A shortcoming in international law as to internal colonialism and the right to self-determination renders the current types of international intervention not just inadequate to contribute to a negotiated solution of ethnic conflicts, but tends to inflame them.
 
Power Sharing as Peace Structure: The Case of Sri Lanka, IICP Working Paper, No. 2, 2005, Johan Galtung, Professor of Peace Studies: ‘’External Colonialism: Democracy :: Internal Colonialism: Human Rights’’

National Liberation Movements in Global Context, Dr. Jeff Sluka, Massey University, New Zealand 
Proceedings of the Conference on 'Tamils in New Zealand', July 1996 - Wellington, New Zealand. 
This situation, where a state exploits and oppresses peoples and regions within their own boundaries much the way the European colonial powers used to exploit and oppress foreign colonies, has been described as "internal colonialism". Sri Lanka is an example of this. Many Third World peoples found that after "independence" they had simply traded one set of oppressors (white) for another (brown and black). The result is that today many Third World states, most of them the direct or indirect result of national liberation wars themselves, are now fighting against national liberation movements within their borders.

Fourth World Colonialism, Indigenous Minorities And Tamil Separatism In Sri Lanka, Bryan Pfaffenberger (Virginia University), Bulletin of Concerned Asian Scholars, Vol. 16, 1984:
Despite the withdrawal of colonial power from Third World countries, forms of oppression that might well be termed "colonial" still persist in many of them — the oppression wrought by nationalist Third World governments whose regimes fail to respect the rights of indigenous minorities. For ethnic and regional minorities in many Third World countries, the arrogance and injustice of these governments matches — and often exceeds — those of the departed European colonial regime. The island nation Sri Lanka presents a case in point. Little public investment appears to reach the Tamil lands….

Thailand
For internal colonization in the kingdom of Thailand, refer to articles on Monthon and on Thaification. There is a posited link between internal colonialism and ethnic rebellion in Thailand.

Turkey 
The internal colonization of the Eastern Provinces was outlined during the Government of Mustafa Kemal Atatürk. Cemil Uyabdin saw the Report for Reform in the East as a guideline to the internal colonization of the Eastern Provinces through which the Kurdish population should be turkified. In a report delivered to the Republican Peoples Party (CHP) following the defeat of the Dersim Rebellion, the Resettlement Law issued in 1934 was also described as an effective vehicle for the internal colonization of the eastern provinces.

China 
Since the beginning of the Chinese administration in Tibet, China's government has been accused of committing both genocide and cultural genocide against the Tibetan people by the TGIE, various Tibetan emigres, and their supporters. Tibet, having been a self-governed province of China, has been completely annexed by China since 1951 with the Tibetan Government in Exile (TGIE) claiming that 1.2 million Tibetans died from the actions of the Chinese administration from 1951-1984. Supporters of the claim that the actions of the Chinese administration in Tibet constitutes genocide and colonialism challenge the Chinese government's claim that Tibet has been considered an integral part of China for centuries, arguing that historical correspondences make it clear that Tibet was not considered a part of China until recent times. However, the nature of Chinese administration in the region has been the subject of fierce debate with many detractors, such as Hong Kong-based Tibet expert Barry Sautman, challenging the notion that Chinese practices in Tibet can be characterized as genocidal or colonial and arguing that the political and legal equality of Tibetans under the current administration undermines the notion of colonialism in the region.

Vietnam 

Exploiting the Indochina War and the modern political theories for their advantage, the Northern Vietnam political parties including a variety of roles and types (Communism, Nationalism, Religions) propagandized and lured the public about the idea of “the new Vietnam” whose origin was completely from the North. The Northern Vietnamese who were considered as leaders by default portrayed Nationalism in such ways that the Red River Delta area’s tradition and culture took dominance. The Ngo Dinh Diem administration was indeed a foundation to “Northernize” South Vietnam. The South people were forced to learn the history of the North and to see any historical events taking place in the North as their origin points. All those learning was to enhance the power of the Northern administration rather than for the sake of learning the past. 

On the other aspect, the shortage of knowledge and consciousness about their origin was the major cause of the fact that South Vietnamese were unable to make use of their tradition and culture to defend themselves against the People's Army of Vietnam when they had to share political power to the Northern immigrants from the 1955 - who won the capital Saigon over the forces that were loyal to Emperor Bao Dai. The South people were pulled into an ambiguous Anti-Communism ideology promoted by the Northern migrants who seized power right after they set their steps to the land of the South. South Vietnamese people could not state or claim the fact that the Northerners were their enemy due to the appearance of millions of Northern migrants on the South territory, which caused a huge stumbling block to psychological warfare and building the social system. The Northern politicians (who migrated to the South in 1954) in the Republic of Vietnam government cared about nothing but power, they had no intention of defending the country (Republic of Vietnam - ROV) because the ROV was not their homeland but the South people’s. The Northern migrants’ easily seizuring power in the Southern land resulted in the corruption of some Northern-migrated high-ranked figures in both the ROV government and the Army of the Republic of Vietnam and the loss of the ROV’s independence on the international political chessboard.

The invasion of South Vietnam is a prohibited topic in history teaching and on mainstream media of Vietnam. It is usually interpreted as a “reunification of the nation”. After The Fall of Saigon, the Northern communists turned their back on their comrades from the South (the Viet Cong and the Provisional Revolutionary Government of the Republic of South Vietnam). There are prejudice and discrimination towards the South people, specifically the people in the Southwest (Mekong Delta) on the mainstream media and daily communication. Northern Vietnamese have privilege in political competition and election, they easily seize high-ranked, high-power positions in the government. Foreign affairs are heavily controlled by the Northside of the government. The South-originated religions Hoa Hao Buddhism and Caodaism are strictly controlled by the government led by the majority of Northerners. After the Fall of Saigon on April 30th 1975, Vietnam seems like it is completely united, both regionally and ideologically. However, it is never a unified Vietnam due to the theory of North-centered: Ha Noi and the North are the standards of Vietnamese tradition, language and custom.

A Vietnam Communist government-funded enterprise named PV Power has invested and been building a hydro dam project in Luang Prabang. This hydro dam is predicted to cause heavy damage to the ecosystem and environment of the Mekong Delta and negatively affect the lives of more than 15 million Southern Vietnamese.

See also
Internally displaced person
Internal migration
Internal passport
Suburban colonization
Environmental racism in Europe
Gentrification

References

Bibliography

 
 *

Further reading
 Abercrombie, Nicholas, Stephan Hill & Bryan S. Turner (2000). The Penguin Dictionary of Sociology. 4th edition. London: Penguin Books.
 Etkind, Alexander (2011). Internal Colonization : Russia’s Imperial Experience. Malden, MA: Polity.
 Gunder Frank, Andre (1970). Latin America: underdevelopment or revolution: essays on the development of underdevelopment and the immediate enemy, New York/London: Monthly Review Press.
 McMichael, P. (2012). Development and Change: A Global Perspective (5th ed.). California: Sage Publications, Inc.
 Salhi Sghaier (2016). Internal colonialism and uneven development: regional marginalisation system in Tunisia 619 p (in Arabic) 
 Thomas, Nicholas (1994). Colonialism’s Culture: Anthropology, Travel and Government. Cambridge: Polity.
 Walls, David. (2008). "Central Appalachia: Internal Colony or Internal Periphery?" (web article), Sonoma State University. Access date: January 5, 2011.
 Wolpe, Harold (1975). "The Theory of Internal Colonialism: The South African Case", in I. Oxaal et al., Beyond the Sociology of Development. London: Routledge & Kegan Paul.

Colonialism
Cultural assimilation
Economic development
Geodemography
Geopolitics
Hegemony
Identity politics
Indigenous land rights
Internal migration
Majority–minority relations
Regionalism (politics)
Sociological theories